Sachini (Sinhala: සචිනි) is a Sinhalese feminine given name that may refer to the following notable people:
Sachini Ayendra Stanley, Sri Lankan film actress 
Sachini Nipunsala (born 1992), Sri Lankam television presenter
Sachini Ranasinghe (born 1994), Sri Lankan chess player

Sinhalese feminine given names